Hoshiyar Qadin (died 21 June 1886) was a consort to Ibrahim Pasha and was Walida Pasha to their son Isma'il Pasha.

Early life
Of Circassian or European origin, Hoshiyar Qadin was in good relationship with Pertevniyal Sultan, the mother of Ottoman Sultan Abdulaziz. Ibrahim had known Istanbul, since he was a hostage in the imperial capital 1806–1807. He may have met and fell in love with Hoshiyar later in Bebek. She married Ibrahim Pasha, and gave birth to Isma'il Pasha on 31 December 1830. After the death of Sa'id Pasha, Isma'il was proclaimed Khedive on 19 January 1863, though the Ottoman Empire and the other Great Powers recognized him only as Wāli, and Hoshiyar became the Walida Pasha.

As Walida Pasha
Hoshiyar Hanim was a public figure whose doings were continually reported by the press, which referred to her simply as Queen Mother. During the 'Urabi revolt her patriotic feelings made her accept 'Urabi as the defender of the country against a British invasion. Putting aside all personal interests and the fact that he was also a menace to the dynasty, she provided him with money and horses and worked with other ladies of the family at preparing bandages and medicine for the wounded.

She was a formidable person of great intelligence and character who wielded considerable influence over her son. When the Sultan Abdulaziz visited Egypt, he made a point of particularly honouring Hoshiar by bestowing on her the Grand Cordon of the Osmaniyeh. This beautiful and very feminine woman brought up her son with unrelenting discipline and would never allow her motherly feelings to get the better of her sense of duty, to such an extant that when the future Khedive was visiting Europe as a child, he was heard to say about Dowager Empress of Austria, who had been particularly kind, "that no one in his own family had ever shown him as much affection." But the Khedive adored his mother and remained to the end a most devoted son.

Hoshiyar lived in her palace of Qasar al-Ali, now part of the residential district of Garden City. There she held a quite incredible state, never condescending to leave her home for anyone else's, no matter how high ranking that person may have been. And indeed, as Ibrahim Pasha's widow and Khedive's mother her position was unique.

Hoshiyar was a pivotal political figure, and one of the few people whom Isma'il trusted. She didn't express her opinion directly in politics. Instead she operated through family members and agents, such as the director of estates, the powerful and cruel chief eunuch, Khalil Agha. After his death in 1880, Ibrahim Edhem took his place as the main agent. Abdallah al-Nadeem, whom the Khedive tried to briefly co-opt, described the head eunuch of al-Walida Pasha as having more influence than the prime minister. Most reports suggested that she was the only family member who was with him when he received the Ottoman decree that deposed him.

She and Isma'il launched a propaganda campaign in Istanbul. In February 1863, Pertevniyal arranged for Isma'il to meet Abdulaziz in private in her palace. In summer of 1864, Hoshiyar traveled to Istanbul, to help her son. She arrived with proposed new heir in question, her grandson Tewfik Pasha, lots of money, and female diplomacy. In spring of 1866, they launched the greatest attack, in which the good offices of Pertevniyal may have been involved. In September 1867, Hoshiyar threw a dinner at her own palace in the shores of the Bosphorus in honour of Pertevniyal. Pertevniyal returned the hospitality with an invitation of Hoshiyar to the Dolmabahçe Palace.

Her court al-Walida Pasha (the Khedive's mother), was said to be larger and more prominent than that of any of his wives. Zevat culture was her and Isma'il's private world. She had an Ottoman culture in her palace, where thousand of slave girls served in her residence in Istanbul. She also possessed a musical troop of slave girls, who performed Ottoman music. Isma'il could talk to her in Turkish or in her Circassian language, and in her palace he was often entertained by Ottoman music.

In 1869, she met with the Princess of Wales Alexandra of Denmark, when the latter visited Cairo with her husband Prince of Wales Edward (future Edward VII). The princess had visited Hoshiyar, and dined with Isma'il's wives in the harem.

Death

Hoshiyar Qadin died at the Greater Qasar al-Ali Palace, Cairo, on 21 June 1886, and was buried there at the Khedival Mausoleum, Al-Rifa'i Mosque, which was built on her orders.

Honour
Foreign honour
 : Order of Osmanieh, 1st Class, 8 April 1863

See also

List of kidnappings
Muhammad Ali Dynasty family tree

References

Sources

1886 deaths 
19th-century Egyptian monarchs
19th-century Muslims 
Burials in Egypt
Egyptian concubines
Formerly missing people 
Kidnapped Egyptian people
Missing person cases in Egypt
Muhammad Ali dynasty 
People from the Ottoman Empire of Circassian descent
Sunni Muslims
Year of birth unknown